A list of the films produced in Mexico in 2010 (see 2010 in film):

2010

References

External links
 Mexican films of 2010 at the Internet Movie Database

List of 2010 box office number-one films in Mexico

2010
Films
Lists of 2010 films by country or language